Mosina  is a town in Poznań County, Greater Poland Voivodeship, Poland, about 20 km south of Poznań, with 12,107 inhabitants (2004). The Mosiński Canal runs east and west through the town, and joins the Warta River just to the east.

History

The oldest known mention of Mosina comes from 1247, while in 1302 it was mentioned as a town. Its name is of Polish origin and comes from the Old Polish word moszyna. For centuries, Mosina was a royal town of the Polish Crown, administratively located in the Poznań County in the Poznań Voivodeship in the Greater Poland Province of the Polish Crown. It was annexed by Prussia in the Second Partition of Poland in 1793. In 1807, it was included in the short-lived Polish Duchy of Warsaw, and after the duchy's dissolution the town was re-annexed by Prussia in 1815. During the Polish Greater Poland uprising and the European Spring of Nations, on May 3, 1848, Polish lawyer Jakub Krotowski-Krauthofer declared Polish independence in Mosina. The small Polish republic centered in Mosina was eventually crushed by the Prussians after their victory over the Polish insurgents at the Battle of Rogalin several days later. Jakub Krotowski-Krauthofer was captured in Konarzewo and then brutally treated, before being released in 1849 by amnesty. Poland eventually regained independence after World War II in 1918, and Mosina was then reintegrated with Poland. In the interbellum it administratively belonged to the Poznań Voivodeship.

Following the joint German-Soviet invasion of Poland, which started World War II in September 1939, the town was occupied by Germany until 1945 and local Poles were subjected to extensive genocidal policies. On October 20, 1939, the German Einsatzgruppe VI carried out a public execution of 15 Poles in the town as part of the Intelligenzaktion. Among the victims were teachers, doctors, merchants and craftsmen from Mosina and nearby villages. It was one of many massacres of Poles committed that day by Germany across the region in attempt to pacify and terrorize the Polish population. Poles from Mosina were also murdered by the German police and Selbstschutz in the nearby town of Murowana Goślina in September and November 1939. In 1939–1941, the occupiers carried out expulsions of Poles, whose houses, shops and workshops were then handed over to German colonists as part of the Lebensraum policy. In 1943, many Polish children were kidnapped and imprisoned by the Germans in a camp for Polish children in Łódź, which was nicknamed "little Auschwitz" due to its conditions. Many children died in the camp.

Sports
The local football club is KS 1920 Mosina. It competes in the lower leagues.

Notable residents 
 Friedrich Bauer (Missionar), (1812-1874), German missionary
 Lazarus Immanuel Fuchs (1833–1902), German mathematician
 Herbert Baum (1912–1942), German resistance fighter
 Monika Jagaciak (1994-), Polish model

References

External links
 Official town webpage

Cities and towns in Greater Poland Voivodeship
Poznań County
Poznań Voivodeship (1921–1939)